Zonites anaphiensis is a species of air-breathing land snail, a terrestrial pulmonate gastropod mollusk in the family Zonitidae. The species is endemic to the island of Anafi in Greece.

References

Zonites
Molluscs of Europe
Endemic fauna of Greece
Gastropods described in 1981
Taxonomy articles created by Polbot